Jalan Lapangan Terbang Taiping, or Taiping Airport Road, Federal Route 313, is a federal road in Perak, Malaysia. The road is located at the Taman Panglima 1 townships near Taiping. It is a main route to Taiping Airport.

At most sections, the Federal Route 313 was built under the JKR R5 road standard, allowing maximum speed limit of up to 90 km/h.

List of junctions and towns

References

Malaysian Federal Roads